Dataupia was a supplier of data warehouse appliances.  Dataupia focuses on data warehousing for applications running on Oracle, Microsoft SQL Server databases.  Dataupia's Satori Server included server computers, storage, and software.

History
Dataupia was founded in 2005 by Foster D. Hinshaw for analytics in "big data" applications such as for telecom and auto-reporting for the Internet of things.

A classic definition of the data warehouse focuses on data storage.  However, the means to retrieve and analyze data, to extract, transform and load data, and to manage the dictionary data are also considered essential components of a data warehouse appliance system.  The Dataupia Satori Server provided all aspects of the data warehouse appliance in a single product.

The company has headquarters in Cambridge, Massachusetts, with additional offices in Binghamton, United Kingdom.  The company was privately held.

Dataupia's name is a portmanteau of the words "data", in reference to the data warehousing industry, and "utopia".  The combination of words is used by the company to imply ideal access to data.

The Dataupia flagship product, Satori Server, is a network-attached data warehouse appliance announced in 2007.  As an appliance, it includes an embedded copy of Linux, a database engine, an aggregation engine, built-in storage, and parallel processors. In contrast to other custom-assembly data warehouse appliances, the Satori Server worked with existing database management systems, rather than requiring them to be replaced. In theory, this would appeal to customers with a huge investment in databases and data warehouse and business intelligence applications.
Competitors included Teradata and IBM (which acquired Netezza in 2010).

In January 2009 Hinshaw temporarily left due to health problems, and Tony Sirianni became chief executive through November.
During the Great Recession, the company reduced its staff and by August 2009 was seeking a buyer for its assets.
By 2017, the company had not issued a press release since the 4.0 version of the product was announced in February 2011.

References

External links
Dataupia web site

Data warehousing products